Benjamin "Ben" Vincent (born 3 November 1976) is an Australian former wrestler who competed at the 1996 Summer Olympics and in the 2000 Summer Olympics.

References

External links
 

1976 births
Living people
Sportsmen from the Australian Capital Territory
Australian male sport wrestlers
Olympic wrestlers of Australia
Wrestlers at the 1996 Summer Olympics
Wrestlers at the 2000 Summer Olympics